Kenney Reservoir is located in Rio Blanco County, Colorado five mlies east of the town of Rangely along Colorado State Highway 64. The reservoir is owned and managed by the Rio Blanco Water Conservancy District.

Dam
The dam, called Taylor Draw Dam, (National ID # CO02572) is an earthen dam, with a large center spillway, built in 1984. The dam was constructed to prevent flooding caused by ice dams on the White River, dams that would cause flooding along Main Street in Rangely.

The dam's height was increased in 1991 to allow for the addition of a hydroelectric power plant. The 2-megawatt plant began operation in 1993 and supplies electricity to the nearby area.

The dam and reservoir have a big problem with siltation.

References

External links
Official website

Reservoirs in Colorado
Dams in Colorado
Dams completed in 1984
Protected areas of Rio Blanco County, Colorado
Buildings and structures in Rio Blanco County, Colorado
Bodies of water of Rio Blanco County, Colorado